Ronald Ray Richmond (born April 1, 1941) is an American politician and lawyer from Florida.

Early life, education and military service
Richmond was born in Linton, Indiana. He graduated from Florida State University with a Bachelor of Arts in 1962 and from the Stetson College of Law with a Juris Doctor in 1969. He is a veteran of the United States Air Force.

Career
Richmond served in the Florida House of Representatives from 1972 to 1984, as a Republican representing the 37th and 49th districts. He also served a stint as minority leader.

He practices law in Tallahassee, Florida.

Personal life
He and his wife Eileen have two children.

References

Living people
1941 births
Republican Party members of the Florida House of Representatives
Stetson University College of Law alumni
People from Greene County, Indiana
People from Holiday, Florida
20th-century American lawyers
21st-century American lawyers
Florida State University alumni
20th-century American politicians